This is a list of films which placed number one at the weekend box office in Japan for the year 2014.

Highest-grossing films

See also
List of Japanese films of 2014

References

2014
2014 in Japanese cinema
Japan